The HTC 7 Pro (also known as the HTC Arrive) is a business class smartphone, part of the HTC 7 series of Internet-enabled, Windows Phone smartphones designed and marketed by HTC Corporation. It is the successor of the HTC Touch Pro2 with a left-side slide-out QWERTY keyboard, with tilting screen.

The CDMA variation of the HTC 7 Pro, known on Sprint Nextel as the HTC Arrive, became available on the Sprint Nextel CDMA network on 20 March 2011. It is also available on US Cellular and Alltel Wireless under its original name of the HTC 7 Pro.

The phone initially comes with the 7.0.7389.0 firmware version, which includes "NoDo" update (March Update) that has features and fixes, which include improvements to functions like copy & paste, faster apps and games, better Marketplace search, Wi-Fi, Outlook, Facebook integration, camera, audio, and other performance improvements.

See also
Windows Phone

References

Windows Phone devices
HTC smartphones
Mobile phones introduced in 2011
Mobile phones with an integrated hardware keyboard

pl:HTC 7 Pro